Dark Side of the Moon is a 1998 graphic adventure game developed and published by SouthPeak Interactive.

Gameplay

Plot

Dark Side of the Moon follows the story of Jake Wright, who inherits the mineral rights to the planet Luna Crysta after his uncle dies suspiciously.

Development
The game was developed and published by SouthPeak Interactive. The game is powered with SouthPeak Interactive's Video Reality engine, which had previously appeared in Temüjin. Dark Side of the Moon was led by Lee Sheldon, who had previously developed the adventure game Ripley's Believe It or Not!: The Riddle of Master Lu. While he had been involved in Temüjin, Sheldon was dissatisfied with the project. Dark Side of the Moon utilizes full-motion video footage of live actors, but the game's backgrounds are almost entirely pre-rendered. According to art director Paul Graham, the game required "500,000 hours of rendering", which was carried out by a render farm of 220 computers.

In September 1998, SouthPeak partnered with Activision to distribute three games, including Dark Side of the Moon, outside United States and Canada.

Reception

The game received average reviews according to the review aggregation website GameRankings. Next Generation said of the game, "It's not bad for an adventure game with FMV, but that really isn't saying much."

The game was a finalist for the Academy of Interactive Arts & Sciences' 1998 "Adventure Game of the Year" award, which ultimately went to Grim Fandango.

References

External links

 
 

1998 video games
Video games developed in the United States
Windows games
Windows-only games
SouthPeak Games
Adventure games
Single-player video games